Édouard Candeveau (11 February 1898 – 12 November 1989) was a Swiss rower who competed at the 1920, 1924 and 1928 Summer Olympics. He won a bronze medal and a gold medal in the coxed pairs in 1920 and 1924, respectively. In 1928, he competed in the single sculls and finished seventh after being eliminated in the quarter finals. At the European championships, Candeveau won four gold, one silver and one bronze medal between 1920 and 1931.

References

External links 
 

1898 births
1989 deaths
Swiss male rowers
Olympic bronze medalists for Switzerland
Olympic gold medalists for Switzerland
Olympic rowers of Switzerland
Rowers at the 1920 Summer Olympics
Rowers at the 1924 Summer Olympics
Rowers at the 1928 Summer Olympics
Olympic medalists in rowing
Medalists at the 1924 Summer Olympics
Medalists at the 1920 Summer Olympics
European Rowing Championships medalists
20th-century Swiss people